Statistics of Lebanese Premier League for the 1997–98 season.

Overview
Al-Ansar won the championship.

League standings

References
RSSSF

Leb
1997–98 in Lebanese football
Lebanese Premier League seasons
1997–98 Lebanese Premier League